Kalmia is an unincorporated community in Harford County, Maryland, United States. The Husband Flint Mill Site was listed on the National Register of Historic Places in 1975.

References

Unincorporated communities in Harford County, Maryland
Unincorporated communities in Maryland